Fuß (German: foot) is a surname. Notable people with the surname include:

 Benjamin Fuß (born 1990), German footballer
 Fritz Fuß, Swiss sidecarcross racer
 Michael Fuß (born 1977), German footballer

German-language surnames
Surnames from nicknames
de:Fuß (Begriffsklärung)
hu:Fuss (egyértelműsítő lap)
sl:Fuss